Men's Combined World Cup 1980/1981

Calendar

Final point standings

In Men's Combined World Cup 1980/81 the best 5 results count.

Note:

In race 3, 4 and 5 not all points were awarded (not enough finishers).

Men's Combined Team Results

bold indicate highest score - italics indicate race wins

World Cup
FIS Alpine Ski World Cup men's combined discipline titles